Cyberlore Studios, Inc. was an American video game developer based in Northampton, Massachusetts.

History 
The company was founded in 1992 by Lester Humphreys, Ken Grey, and Herb Perez. Since 1992, they produced expansion packs for MechWarrior 4, Heroes of Might and Magic II, and Warcraft II: Beyond the Dark Portal. They also produced Playboy: The Mansion (2004), a simulation game based on the life of Hugh Hefner and Playboy, and a PlayStation 2 version of the classic board game Risk. Their most notable game is Majesty: The Fantasy Kingdom Sim, whose original concept was created by Jim DuBois, who worked for the company as a senior designer.

In 2005, Cyberlore ceased development of general entertainment games after the collapse of their publisher, Hip Games, and the subsequent layoff of two-thirds of their staff.  The company refocused on the serious game corporate training market, under the new company name of Minerva.

Published works
Al-Qadim: The Genie's Curse (1994)
Entomorph: Plague of the Darkfall (1995)
Warcraft II: Beyond the Dark Portal (1996)
Heroes of Might and Magic II: The Price of Loyalty (1997)
Deadlock II: Shrine Wars (1998)
Majesty: The Fantasy Kingdom Sim (2000)
Majesty: The Northern Expansion (2001)
MechWarrior 4: Black Knight (2001)
MechWarrior 4: Mercenaries (2002)
Risk: Global Domination (2003)
Playboy: The Mansion (2004)

References

External links
Cyberlore Studios

Video game development companies
Video game companies established in 1992
Video game companies disestablished in 2005
Defunct video game companies of the United States
Defunct companies based in Massachusetts